The Rimi Vilnius Marathon is an annual road marathon event, held in Vilnius, Lithuania. The main sponsor of the marathon is Rimi. Race offers marathon, half marathon, 10k, 5k and children run experience. 

The course includes the most beautiful and distinctive places in Vilnius: Vilnius Old Town, Vingis Park, riverbank of Neris, and even forest in Valakampiai. The start and finish line is near the Cathedral Square in the very heart of Vilnius.

The event is organized by the Public Institution "Tarptautinis Maratonas". This institution also organizes other endurance sports events – Trakai triathlon, Vilnius Women Run, and Vilnius Christmas run.

History 
The first Vilnius Marathon was launched in 1990. After few pauses and difficulties, it reached 2001, when the Lithuanian Athletic Federation organised the first mass run (Maxima Cup), which became the predecessor of the Vilnius Marathon. Longest distance in 2001 was 10 kilometers.

Full distance of the full marathon (42 km 195 metres) was launched on September 11, 2004. This day started new history of Vilnius, when more than 200 professional and non-professional runners from 10 countries participated in the event.

Half Marathon distance was added to the programme in 2006. Quarter marathon was introduced in 2012.

In 2007, Vilnius Marathon became a member of AIMS. From that moment full marathon course was always certified.

This event tripled the number of participants between 2012 and 2015. In 2012 there were over 5000 runners, while 16424 runners ran the marathon event in 2015.

The Vilnius marathon course record of 2:19:49 was set by Dmitrijs Serjogins from Latvia in 2020. The women's record of 2:39:40 was set by Diana Lobačevskė during the 2020 Vilnius marathon.

Results

Last updated: 2020–01–29.

References

External links
  Vilnius Marathon
  Photos of 2014
 List of winners by year

Marathons in Lithuania
Sport in Vilnius
Recurring sporting events established in 2001
Half marathons
2001 establishments in Lithuania
Autumn events in Lithuania